Fred Zinner (14 August 1903 – 6 January 1994) was a Belgian sprinter. He competed in the men's 100 metres at the 1928 Summer Olympics.

References

External links
 

1903 births
1994 deaths
Athletes (track and field) at the 1924 Summer Olympics
Athletes (track and field) at the 1928 Summer Olympics
Belgian male sprinters
Belgian male discus throwers
Olympic athletes of Belgium
Place of birth missing